Ramchandra or Ramachandra may refer to:

Rama, the Ancient Indian king regarded as an incarnation of Vishnu
Ramachandra of Devagiri (r. c. 1271–1311), Indian king from the Seuna (Yadava) dynasty
C. Ramchandra (1918–1982), Bollywood music director
Master Ramchundra (1821–1880), nineteenth-century Indian mathematician
Ramachandra Guha (born 1958), an Indian historian and economist
Ramachandra Naidu Galla, an Indian industrialist

See also  
 

Masculine given names